The Calcare di Zorzino, Italian for Zorzino Limestone is a Late Triassic (Norian) geological formation in Italy (Cene and ). Pterosaurs and Tanystropheids have been recovered in this formation.

Vertebrate paleofauna

Other reptiles 

 Aetosaurus ferratus
 Bergamodactylus wildi
 Drepanosaurus unguicaudatus
 Endennasaurus acutirostris
 Langobardisaurus pandolfii
 Megalancosaurus endennae
 M. preonensis
 Mystriosuchus planirostris
 Psephoderma alpinum
 Vallesaurus cenensis
 V. zorzinensis
 Diphydontosaurus sp.
 ?Mystriosuchus sp.
 ?Theropoda indet.

Fish 

 Dandya ovalis
 Dapedium noricum
 Gibbodon cenensis
 Legnonotus krambergeri
 Parapholidophorus nybelini
 Pholidoctenus serianus
 Pholidorhynchodon malzannii
 Pseudodalatias barnstonensis
 Sargodon tomicus

References

Bibliography 
  
  
 
 

Geologic formations of Italy
Triassic System of Europe
Triassic Italy
Norian Stage
Limestone formations
Marl formations
Shallow marine deposits
Paleontology in Italy
Formations